The 2005 All-Ireland Senior Club Camogie Championship for the leading clubs in the women's team field sport of camogie was won for the second year in succession by St Lachtain’s, Freshford (Kilkenny), who defeated Davitts (Gal) in the final, played at Cloughjordan.

Arrangements
The championship was organised on the traditional provincial system used in Gaelic Games since the 1880s, with O’Donovan Rossa and Cashel winning the championships of the other two provinces. Marie O'Connor scored three goals for Lachtain’s in their semi-final victory over Rossa. Davitt’s Lourda Kavanagh scored an equalizing goal in the fourth minute of added time in the semi-final against Cashel. Then Caitríona Kelly secured Davitt’s place in the final with three well-taken goals in the replay.

The Final
St Lachtain’s captain Margaret Hickey missed the final through injury, but scores from Imelda Kennedy and Marie O'Connor secured the title in her absence.

Final stages

References

External links
 Camogie Association

2005 in camogie
2005